Goce Markovski (born 9 July 1970) is a retired Macedonian football midfielder.

References

1970 births
Living people
Macedonian footballers
FK Pobeda players
FK Makedonija Gjorče Petrov players
FK Vardar players
KF Shkëndija players
FK Rabotnički players
Association football midfielders
North Macedonia international footballers